Lüganuse Parish is a municipality of Ida-Viru County in northern Estonia. As of 1 January 2015, it had a population of 2,941.

In October 2013, the neighbouring Maidla Parish and the town of Püssi were merged into Lüganuse Parish.

Settlements
Towns
Kiviõli, Püssi
Small boroughs
Erra, Lüganuse, Sonda
Villages
Aa, Aidu, Aidu-Liiva, Aidu-Nõmme, Aidu-Sooküla, Aruküla, Arupäälse, Aruvälja, Erra-Liiva, Hirmuse, Ilmaste, Irvala, Jabara, Koljala, Koolma, Kopli, Kulja, Liimala, Lipu, Lohkuse, Lümatu, Maidla, Matka, Mehide, Moldova, Mustmätta, Nüri, Oandu, Ojamaa, Piilse, Purtse, Rebu, Rääsa, Salaküla, Satsu, Savala, Sirtsi, Soonurme, Tarumaa, Uljaste, Uniküla, Vainu, Vana-Sonda, Varinurme, Varja, Veneoja, Virunurme and Voorepera.

Religion

References

External links